This is a list of vegetables which are grown or harvested primarily for the consumption of their leafy parts, either raw or cooked. Many vegetables with leaves that are consumed in small quantities as a spice such as oregano, for medicinal purposes such as lime, or used in infusions such as tea, are not included in this list.

List
 Key

 Citations marked with Ecoport are from the Ecoport Web site, an ecology portal developed in collaboration with the FAO.
 Those marked with GRIN are from the GRIN Taxonomy of Food Plants.
 Sources marked with Duke are from James Duke's book Handbook of Energy Crops.

See also

 List of vegetables
 List of foods
 List of vegetable dishes

References

External links

'vegetables, leaf
'
vegetables, leaf